Chen Dong (1086–1127) was a student at 17 year old (1103) on the Imperial University in the capital city of Kaifeng during the Song Dynasty. Ten years later he got a job as scholar on the Imperial academy. Chen Dong stood up against the Song policy and was a leader in 1125 during the rebellion against six corrupt officials. He got a historical stature and has been called the voice of public opinion because the voice of the teachers and students were in agree with the voice of the people and soldiers. Chen Dong got executed in 1127, this was in the time the city fell to the Jurchen people as the Northern Song Dynasty last to 1127. Despite the execution of Chen Dong he got a place in the History of Song (book) (Song shi) A year later he got rehabilitated and in 1134 he got a posthumous honor of minister, given by the Emperor Gaozong of Song.

Chen Dong is depicted in the Wu Shuang Pu (無雙譜, Table of Peerless Heroes) by Jin Guliang. The images and poems for this book were widely spread and reused, including on porcelain works.

References

External links
  Chen Dong on the site of Baidu Baike

Legendary Chinese people
1086 births
1127 deaths
11th-century Chinese people
12th-century Chinese people
Executed Song dynasty people